= Khopat, Thane =

Khopat
- Location in Maharashtra, India
- Coordinates: 19°12′2″N 72°58′12″E
- Country: India
- State: Maharashtra
- District: Thane
- Named for: Shree Apartment (Om kar mitra mandal), Gokuldasvadi, Bekare House Famous Place
  - Rank: 1

Languages
  - Official: Marathi
- Time zone: UTC+5:30 (IST)
- Nearest city: Thane

Khopat (Devnagari:खोपट) is an area located in the city of Thane, Maharashtra, India.
